The Wolf Amendment is a law passed by the United States Congress in 2011, named after then–United States Representative Frank Wolf, that prohibits the United States National Aeronautics and Space Administration (NASA) from using government funds to engage in direct, bilateral cooperation with the Chinese government and China-affiliated organizations from its activities without explicit authorization from the Federal Bureau of Investigation and the U.S. Congress. It has been inserted annually into appropriations bills since then.

History
In May 1999, the Report of the Select Committee on U.S. National Security and Military/Commercial Concerns with the People's Republic of China was made public. It alleged that technical information provided by American commercial satellite manufacturers to China in connection with satellite launches could have been used to improve Chinese intercontinental ballistic missile technology.

In 2010, Rep. John Culberson urged President Barack Obama not to allow further contact between NASA and the China National Space Administration (CNSA). In a letter addressed to the President, he wrote:

I have grave concerns about the nature and goals of China’s space program and strongly oppose any cooperation between NASA and CNSA’s human space flight programs without Congressional authorization.

In April 2011, the 112th United States Congress banned NASA from engaging in bilateral agreements and coordination with China. As stated under Public Law 112–10, Sec. 1340:

In 2013, officials at NASA Ames prohibited Chinese nationals from attending Kepler Science Conference II. A number of American scientists boycotted the meeting, with senior academics either withdrawing individually or pulling out their entire research groups. Rep. Frank Wolf wrote a letter to NASA Administrator Charlie Bolden, saying that the restriction only applied to bilateral meetings and activities between NASA and the Chinese government or Chinese-owned companies, whereas Kepler Science Conference II is a multilateral event. NASA later reversed the ban and admitted a mistake in barring individual Chinese nationals who did not represent their government in official capacity.

During China's 2019 Chang'e 4 mission, NASA collaborated with China to monitor the moon lander and Yutu 2 rover on the lunar far-side using NASA's Lunar Reconnaissance Orbiter. NASA was able to do so by getting congressional approval for the specific interaction and sharing data with researchers globally.  NASA stated:

Status

Reception 
Dean Cheng from the Heritage Foundation argues that more interaction with the Chinese is possible in the area of sharing already collected data, and that sharing data such as Geodesy information and lunar conditions may "help create a pattern of interaction that might lower some of the barriers to information exchange.". Sir Martin Rees, the fifteenth Astronomer Royal of Great Britain, has called the ban a "deplorable 'own goal' by the US".

See also 

Politics of the International Space Station
Space advocacy
Space law
Space policy

References 

Anti-Chinese sentiment in the United States
NASA
China–United States relations